Rajnarayan Budholiya ( Rajju Maharaj ) (10 April 1961 – 10 October 2021) was an Indian politician who served as a member of parliament for the Hamirpur Lok Sabha constituency in the 14th Lok Sabha. He also served as a member of the legislative assembly for the Mahoba Vidhansabha constituency for the 16th legislative assembly of Uttar Pradesh.

References

External links
 Official biographical sketch in Parliament of India website

1961 births
2021 deaths
People from Hamirpur, Uttar Pradesh
India MPs 2004–2009
Samajwadi Party politicians
Lok Sabha members from Uttar Pradesh
Bharatiya Janata Party politicians from Uttar Pradesh